Jean Pierre Marie Montet (27 June 1885 – 19 June 1966) was a French Egyptologist.

Biography
Montet was born in Villefranche-sur-Saône, Rhône, and began his studies under Victor Loret at the University of Lyon.

He excavated at Byblos in Lebanon between 1921 and 1924, excavating tombs of rulers from Middle Kingdom times. Between 1929 and 1939, he excavated at Tanis, Egypt, finding the royal necropolis of the Twenty-first and Twenty-second Dynasties: those finds almost equalled that of Tutankhamun's tomb in the Valley of the Kings.

In the 1939–1940 Egypt excavation season, he discovered the completely-intact tombs of three Egyptian pharaohs at Tanis: Psusennes I, Amenemope, and Shoshenq II along with the partially plundered tomb of Takelot I. The latter tomb contained a gold bracelet of Osorkon I, Takelot's father, as well as a heart scarab. He also found the fully plundered tomb of Osorkon II as well as the partly plundered tomb of this king's son, Prince Hornakht. The start of World War II in Western Europe in May 1940 stopped all excavation work at Tanis. However, after the war, Montet resumed his activities at Tanis and proceeded to uncover the intact tomb of General Wendjebauendjed, (literally the Commander-in-Chief of the Army) who served under Psusennes I, in 1946.

During his academic career, he served as Professor of Egyptology at the University of Strasbourg from 1919 to 1948 and then at the Collège de France, Paris, between 1948 and 1956. He died in Paris on 19 June 1966.

Legacy
Montet believed that his excavations at Tanis had uncovered Pi-Ramesses. After his death, Austrian Egyptologist Manfred Bietak discovered that although Montet had discovered Pi-Ramesses stonework at Tanis, the true location of the ancient city lay some 30 km to the south. Montet can be credited, however, as the discoverer of the "transplanted" city of Pi-Ramesses.

Works
 Byblos et l'Egypte, quatre campagnes de fouilles à Byblos, 1928
 La Necropole Royale de Tanis, 1958
 Everyday Life in the Days of Ramesses the Great, 1958
 Eternal Egypt, 1964
 Tanis, douze années de fouilles dans une capitale oubliée du delta Égyptien, Payot, Paris, 1942 ('Tanis, Twelve Years of Excavations in a Forgotten Capital of the Egyptian Delta')

External links 
 Treasures of Tanis
BBC Lost Cities of the Ancients
WGBH-TV documentary film The Silver Pharaoh (2010), Montet is depicted among reenactors
 "Pierre Montet", in Je m'appelle Byblos, Jean-Pierre Thiollet, H & D, 2005, p. 255. 

1885 births
1966 deaths
20th-century French archaeologists
People from Villefranche-sur-Saône
French Egyptologists
University of Lyon alumni
Academic staff of the University of Strasbourg
Academic staff of the Collège de France
Members of the Académie des Inscriptions et Belles-Lettres
Members of the Institut Français d'Archéologie Orientale
Phoenician-punic archaeologists
Tanis
Pi-Ramesses